Oman competed at the 2014 Summer Youth Olympics, in Nanjing, China from 16 August to 28 August 2014.

Athletics

Oman qualified one athlete.

Qualification Legend: Q=Final A (medal); qB=Final B (non-medal); qC=Final C (non-medal); qD=Final D (non-medal); qE=Final E (non-medal)

Girls
Track & road events

Beach Volleyball

Oman was given a team to compete from the tripartite committee.

References

2014 in Omani sport
Nations at the 2014 Summer Youth Olympics
Oman at the Youth Olympics